David Terzungwe Tyavkase (born December 30, 1984, in Benue State) is a Nigerian football player currently with Lobi Stars FC

Career 
Tyavkase began his career with Enyimba and in July 2007 joined  Lobi Stars. After a two-year spell, he returned on 12 February 2009 to Enyimba.

The offensive allrounder, who can play as striker or midfielder, returned to Lobi at the start of the 2012 season. In September 2013, Tyavkase left Nigeria for the 2012–13 Gabonese league winners US Bitam.

International 
He earned in the year 2005 season one cap for the Nigeria national football team.

References 

1984 births
Enyimba F.C. players
Association football forwards
Living people
Nigerian footballers
Lobi Stars F.C. players
Nigerian expatriate footballers
Expatriate footballers in Gabon
Nigeria international footballers
Gabon Championnat National D1 players